Olive Juice is a romantic comedy shot on location in Mount Dora, Kissimmee and Orlando, Florida.   It was the feature film directorial debut for Ken Hastings.  It was one of the more significant independent films produced in the Florida film industry.

Plot 
Leighanne Littrell stars as the spunky Michelle Malloy who feels life is perfect.  But she is soon caught unprepared when she learns that her mother has grown ill. The young lady promptly returns to Orlando to visit her sick mother.  While she is visiting, Michelle soon learns that her fiancé is not the perfect man that she believed he was.  Not only does he have a sordid past but he is also involved in some rather unethical activity.  She soon grows depressed as future plans for her living happily ever after now appear doomed.

She soon finds solace with a local pet shop owner who steals her heart with his natural charm and his lovable inventory.  Many comedic pratfalls ensue as she tries to fight her true feelings simply because her recent split with her fiancé went so badly.

Technical Specs 
 Language: English
 Sound: Dolby Digital 5.1
 Aspect ratio: 1.85:1
 Running time: 88 minutes
 Rating: PG-13 (contains adult language and sexual content)

Cast 
 Leighanne Littrell as Michelle Malloy
 James Berlau as Keeler Davis
 Michael Hartson as Matt
 Ginger King as Helen Malloy
 Jay Love as DJ Dan
 Bette Berlau as Jodi
 Elizabeth Auten as Shawna
 Jim R. Coleman as Trace
 Lisa Sleeper as Cat Lover
 Ken Rush as Ronnie Dupree
 Abby Boquiren as Girl Pushing Wheelchair
 James Martin Kelly as Chef Nico
 Brian Littrell as Horse-Drawn Carriage Driver
 A.J. McLean as DJ Naughty
 Allan Medina as Club Patron
 Eli Waligora as Bar Patron
 Cornelia White as 'A**hole' Woman

Crew 
 Production company - Doubble Troubble Entertainment, From Within Productions, Inc.
 Written and directed by Ken Hastings
 Produced by Nicholas D. Karvounis
 Associated Produced by Mark Anthony Galluzzo and Leighanne Littrell
 Original music by Brett Laurence, Jason Libs and Michael Tschanz
 Cinematography by Alex D. Karvounis
 Film editing by Alex D. Karvounis and Nicholas D. Karvounis
 Production design by Neil Norman
 Art direction by Ben Daseler
 Costume design by Cynthia Nordstrom
 Production management - Larry A. Lee
 Art department - Kimberly Burke

External links 
 
 Apollo Guide

2001 films
2001 romantic comedy films
American romantic comedy films
American independent films
2001 directorial debut films
2001 independent films
2000s English-language films
2000s American films